Ricardo Brown (born 7 February 1990) is a Jamaican boxer. He competed in the men's super heavyweight event at the 2020 Summer Olympics.

References

External links
 

1990 births
Living people
Jamaican male boxers
Olympic boxers of Jamaica
Boxers at the 2020 Summer Olympics
People from Spanish Town
Super-heavyweight boxers
Pan American Games medalists in boxing
Pan American Games bronze medalists for Jamaica
Medalists at the 2019 Pan American Games
20th-century Jamaican people
21st-century Jamaican people